Lessenich is a small village at the northern rim of the Eifel hill chain. It belongs to the town of Mechernich in the district of Euskirchen.
Lessenich is situated in the centre of the triangle of Mechernich, Euskirchen und Bad Münstereifel. 
The Roman Eifel Aqueduct to Cologne and the Bundesautobahn 1 both are along the villages area.
The three castles Burg Zievel, Burg Veynau and Burg Satzvey are in the villages surroundings.

References

External links 
 Website of Lessenich
 Website of local soccer club TuS Veytal
 Entry for village in GenWiki

Villages in North Rhine-Westphalia